Thomas Craig may refer to:

Sportsmen
 Tom Craig (footballer) (fl. 1955–1968), Scottish footballer (Dumbarton FC, East Stirlingshire)
 Tom Craig (field hockey) (born 1995), Australian field hockey player
 Tommy Craig (born 1950), Scottish footballer 
 Tully Craig (1895–1963), Scottish footballer and manager, born Thomas Craig

Artists
 Tom Craig (artist) (1906–1969), American watercolorist, see List of Guggenheim Fellowships awarded in 1941
 Thomas Bigelow Craig (1849–1924), American landscape painter

Politicians
 Thomas Dixon Craig (1842–1905), Canadian politician
 Thomas S. Crago (1866–1925), U.S. politician

Others
 Sir Thomas Craig (jurist) (1538–1608), Scottish jurist and poet
 Thomas Craig (actor) (born 1962), English actor
 Tom Craig (photographer) (born 1974), British documentary photographer
 Thomas Craig (mathematician) (1855–1900), American professor